Al-Sha'ab Hadramaut Club is a Yemeni football team playing at the top level. It is based in Mukalla.  Their home stadium is Baradem Mukalla Stadium. It is one of the highest ranking teams in Yemen, winning 2 President Cups and a Yemeni Super Cup

History

Achievements
Yemeni President Cup: 2
2000, 2006
Yemeni Super Cup: 1
2014

Performance in AFC competitions
AFC Cup: 1 appearance
2008: Group Stage

AFC Cup Winners Cup: 1 appearance
2001–02: First Round

Sha'ab
Association football clubs established in 1972
1972 establishments in South Yemen